Nirmala S Mourya is a first women Vice Chancellor of Veer Bahadur Singh Purvanchal University, Jaunpur, Uttar Pradesh. Former Registrar of Higher Education and Research Institute, Dakshina Bharat Hindi Prachar Sabha, Madras.

Awards 
Mahatma Gandhi International Award 2020

References

Indian academic administrators
Living people
1958 births